The Judge Perez Bridge, also known as the Belle Chasse Bridge, is a vertical-lift bridge in the U.S. state of Louisiana which carries northbound Louisiana Highway 23 over the Gulf Intracoastal Waterway between Belle Chasse and Terrytown.  The bridge is paired with the Belle Chasse Tunnel which carries southbound LA 23.  Construction began in March 1967, and the bridge opened for traffic in September 1968. It has been plagued with mechanical issues since it opened. Commuters have had to back down off the bridge due to a malfunction.

The bridge was built to relieve traffic from the Belle Chasse Tunnel.  It was part of a parish project of four-laning Highway 23 throughout the road's entire length to Venice.  According to the Plaquemines Gazette, the $3.3 million structure was built by Plaquemines Parish using its Parish Royalty Road Fund without charge to local taxpayers.  Boh Brothers worked on its construction.

There have been plans for replacing the tunnel and lift bridge with new and improved high-rise structures, and construction has since started to build a bridge that will replace them.

References

Road bridges in Louisiana
Bridges completed in 1968
Vertical lift bridges in Louisiana
Buildings and structures in Plaquemines Parish, Louisiana
Buildings and structures in Jefferson Parish, Louisiana
1968 establishments in Louisiana